"Mister Pleasant" (sometimes written as "Mr. Pleasant") is a song recorded by British rock group the Kinks in 1967, written by Ray Davies.

Background
"Mister Pleasant" is lyrically somewhat similar to the earlier track "A Well Respected Man", as it satirises the heedless complacency of a nouveau riche who, for all his newfound worldly success, is but a foolish cuckold.  Musically, the song has strong English Music Hall influences and a "trad jazz" backing that features a trombone and ragtime-style piano (played by Nicky Hopkins).

Billboard described the single as "clever novelty material penned by Ray Davies with an easy dance beat in strong support."

Chart performance
It was released as the A-side of a single in the USA and mainland Europe but not in the UK. It was released in the UK six months later as the B-side to "Autumn Almanac". The song is now available as a bonus track to their album Face to Face, and an alternate version was also released as a bonus track on the 2011 deluxe reissue of Something Else by the Kinks. Due to the Kinks' absence from American touring and the single's noncommercial sound, "Mister Pleasant" did not fare well in the USA, only managing a peak of number 80—their poorest showing since "See My Friends" failed to reach the Hot 100 in 1965—despite being tapped as likely Top 20 material by Billboard magazine. The publication characterized it as a "clever novelty" piece, which "should skyrocket the group back up to the top of Hot 100 once again." "Mr. Pleasant" was much more successful in Europe, particularly the Netherlands (where it reached number 2) and Belgium (number 3).

While The Kinks mimed 'Mister Pleasant' on the European TV shows 'Fan Club' and 'Beat Club' in 1967 to promote the single, as well as recording it for the BBC in the same year, the only time it was documented as having been played live in concert by the group was at a New York concert on 27 March 1971.

B-sides
While USA B-side "Harry Rag" was included on the upcoming Something Else by The Kinks album (released in September), European B-side "This is Where I Belong" remained unavailable in the UK or USA. The track had been recorded with the sessions for Face to Face but not included (although it is currently available on the CD reissue, along with "Mister Pleasant"). It was made available in the USA on The Kink Kronikles in 1972 but was only released in the UK in 1984.

French EP
As 4-track EPs were much more common in France than 2-track singles, most Kinks singles were issued as EPs there, usually adding two album tracks. The EP for "Mister Pleasant", however, contained all exclusive tracks. As well as both sides of the European single (see above), the EP contained "Two Sisters" from the as-yet-unreleased Something Else by... and the debut of "Village Green" which only became available in the UK 18 months later on the album The Kinks Are the Village Green Preservation Society.

Track listing
All tracks written by Ray Davies.

Side one
"Mister Pleasant"3:00
"This is Where I Belong"2:28

Side two
"Two Sisters"2:00
"Village Green"2:08

Personnel 
According to band researcher Doug Hinman:

The Kinks
Ray Davies lead vocal, acoustic guitar
Dave Davies backing vocal, electric guitar
Pete Quaife backing vocal, bass
Mick Avory drums

Additional musicians
John Beecham or an unidentified session musician trombone
Rasa Davies backing vocal
Nicky Hopkins piano

Charts

Other versions
 The Mission covered the song on their 1990 album Grains of Sand.

References

Sources 

 
 
 

The Kinks songs
1967 singles
Songs written by Ray Davies
Pye Records singles
1967 songs
Reprise Records singles
Song recordings produced by Shel Talmy